Neibert is an unincorporated community and census-designated place (CDP) in Logan County, West Virginia, United States. Its population was 183 as of the 2010 census.

Geography
Neibert is in south-central Logan County, on the east side of the Guyandotte River. Hanging Rock Highway, former West Virginia Route 10, is the main road through the community, leading northwest (downriver)  to Logan, the county seat, and southeast (upriver)  to Man.

References

Census-designated places in Logan County, West Virginia
Census-designated places in West Virginia
Populated places on the Guyandotte River